Shandong Arena is an indoor sporting arena located in Jinan, Shandong, China. The capacity of the arena is 8,800 spectators and opened in 1979.  It hosts indoor sporting events such as basketball and volleyball. It hosts the Shandong Heroes of the Chinese Basketball Association (CBA).

References

Indoor arenas in China
Sports venues in Shandong
Shandong Hi-Speed Kirin